Karl Robert Sweetan (October 2, 1942 – July 2, 2000) was a professional American football quarterback. He played five NFL seasons, from 1966 to 1970, for three teams.

Early life
Sweetan grew up in Dallas and graduated from South Oak Cliff High School in 1960.

College career
Sweetan played football at Navarro Junior College and Texas A&M before transferring to Wake Forest.

Sweetan was Wake Forest's starting quarterback in 1963, his senior year. He completed 79 of 218 passes for 674 yards, throwing 1 touchdown and 18 interceptions. His 218 pass attempts were the 2nd highest in the conference, and 5th highest in the country.

Professional football
Undrafted by the National Football League out of college, Sweetan played quarterback and defensive back for the Canadian Football League’s Toronto Argonauts during the 1964 season. In the 1965 NFL Draft, he was an 18th round draft choice of the Detroit Lions.

During his first season, in 1966, he replaced an injured Milt Plum in an October 16 game against the Baltimore Colts. In that game, Sweetan threw a 99 yard pass to Pat Studstill that will always be an NFL record for longest pass completion. Sweetan was the 2nd NFL quarterback to accomplish the feat; as of 2021, a total of 12 NFL quarterbacks have thrown a 99 yard pass, with the most recent being Eli Manning in 2011.

Sweetan played himself in the 1967 movie, Paper Lion, which starred Alan Alda as an amateur participating at quarterback during the Lions preseason (based on an actual experience by the writer George Plimpton). 

Sweetan gained a different kind of notoriety when it was alleged that he tried to sell an NFL football playbook to another team; however, the charge was not proven.

Personal

Sweetan spent the last 27 years of his life in Las Vegas, where he worked for a series of casinos; his last job was as a baccarat dealer at the Las Vegas Hilton. He was survived by 4 daughters and a son. 

According to a 1966 article in the Detroit Jewish News, Sweetan said he was Jewish.

References

1942 births
2000 deaths
People from Dallas
American football quarterbacks
Navarro Bulldogs football players
Wake Forest Demon Deacons football players
Detroit Lions players
New Orleans Saints players
Los Angeles Rams players
Toronto Argonauts players